Gnomidolon pubicolle is a species of beetle in the family Cerambycidae. It was described by Joly in 1990.

References

Gnomidolon
Beetles described in 1990